Queen's Park is a county cricket ground located in Chesterfield, Derbyshire, England and lies within a park in the centre of the town established for Queen Victoria's golden jubilee in 1887. It has a small pavilion and is surrounded by mature trees.

The park is the home of Chesterfield CC and also played home to Derbyshire CCC for 100 years between 1898 and 1998, before the county team returned in 2006 after an 8-year absence. It was at one time surrounded by a banked cycle track. It is a small ground and slow to dry after rain, which can provide a green wicket. The size of the ground however, lends itself to rapid scoring on good wickets.

History 

In 1886, the then Mayor of Chesterfield proposed that a public park be created to mark Queen Victoria's upcoming golden jubilee in 1887. However, it took the Local Government Board a further six years to agree on costs and the park was eventually opened to the public on 2 August 1893. Chesterfield Cricket Club was granted exclusive use of the ground in February 1894, and the first game was played there on 5 May 1894.

There was an unusual incident during the County Championship match between Derbyshire and Yorkshire in mid-1946. After two overs were bowled in the Derbyshire first innings, Yorkshire captain Len Hutton asked for the length of the pitch to be measured. It was found to be 24 yards long, instead of the regulation 22 yards. The pitch was correctly reset, and the game continued.

The return of county cricket 

After a century of first-class cricket at Chesterfield between 1898 and 1998, the next seven seasons saw Derbyshire play no first-class or List A matches on the ground.

However, following a multimillion-pound refurbishment and upgrade of the entire park including the cricketing facilities, Derbyshire returned by taking on Worcestershire in a County Championship Division Two game between 26 and 29 July. The game ended in a draw, with Australian Marcus North avoiding defeat for the home side by scoring 161 runs, including 24 boundaries. Attendances for all four days was high, and saw Derbyshire announce a four-year deal to play County Cricket at the ground soon after the game.

The Sunday then saw a visit from a star-studded Surrey Brown Caps side and despite a heavy loss, a large crowd were treated to some entertainment by Surrey batsman Ali Brown who scored 106 from just 68 deliveries.

2007 festival 

The 2007 festival was scheduled to run from 25 to 29 July and would have consisted of a four-day Liverpool Victoria County Championship game against Somerset and the NatWest Pro 40 opener against Kent Spitfires. Both of these matches were moved to Derbyshire's regular ground in Derby due to the Queen's Park ground being waterlogged. Instead, the festival began with the NatWest Pro 40 game against Durham Dynamos on 4th September and saw Durham win convincingly by seven wickets. The festival continued with the Liverpool Victoria County Championship game against Nottinghamshire from 6 to 9 September, where Nottinghamshire won by an innings and six runs inside three days. Nottinghamshire skipper Stephen Fleming helped the visitors to the win, scoring 243 runs, including 40 fours.

First-class records at Queen's Park

Notation 

Team notation
 300-3 indicates that a team scored 300 runs for three wickets and the innings was closed, either due to a successful run chase or if no playing time remained.
 300-3d indicates that a team scored 300 runs for three wickets, and declared its innings closed.
 300 indicates that a team scored 300 runs and was all out.

Batting notation
 100 indicates that a batsman scored 100 runs and was out.
 100* indicates that a batsman scored 100 runs and was not out.
 100* against a partnership means that the two batsmen added 100 runs to the team's total, and neither of them was out.

Bowling notation
 5-100 indicates that a bowler captured 5 wickets while conceding 100 runs.

Team scoring records

Batting records

Bowling records 

Highest attendance – 14,000 v. Yorkshire, 1948

References

External links 
 Derbyshire County Cricket Club Official Website

Cricket grounds in Derbyshire
1898 establishments in England
Chesterfield, Derbyshire
Sports venues completed in 1898
Grade II* listed parks and gardens in Derbyshire